Depden is a village and civil parish in the West Suffolk district of Suffolk in eastern England. Located on the A143 around five miles south-west of Bury St Edmunds, in 2005 its population was 200, reducing to 184 at the 2011 Census.

Further reading

References

Villages in Suffolk
Civil parishes in Suffolk
Borough of St Edmundsbury